Damion Williams (born 26 February 1981) is a Jamaican international footballer who plays for Portmore United, as a midfielder.

Career

Club career
Williams has played for Waterhouse, Portmore United and Constant Spring, before moving to current club Nybergsund in 2009. In 2012, Williams returned to Portmore United.

International career
Williams appeared at the 2001 FIFA World Youth Championship, and made his international debut for Jamaica that same year.

Charity / Youth Soccer Development
In the Summer of 2012, Williams acted as a guest coach/counselor at the Youth Soccer Summer Camp of Brooklyn Athletics.

References

1981 births
Living people
Jamaican footballers
Jamaican expatriate footballers
Jamaica international footballers
2011 CONCACAF Gold Cup players
Expatriate footballers in Norway
Jamaican expatriate sportspeople in Norway
Association football midfielders
National Premier League players
Nybergsund IL players